FC Bazar-Korgon-Babur is a football club based in Bazar-Korgon that plays in the Kyrgyzstan League, the top division in Kyrgyzstan.

History 
1995: Founded as FC Navruz Bazar-Korgon.
1997: Renamed as FC Bazar-Korgon-Babur.

Achievements
Kyrgyzstan League:
11th place, Zone B: 1998

Kyrgyzstan Cup:

Current squad

Football clubs in Kyrgyzstan
1995 establishments in Kyrgyzstan
Association football clubs established in 1995